Sunday Songs is the debut album from Finnish singer-songwriter Paradise Oskar, it was released on May 2, 2011. The first single released from the album "Da Da Dam" was released on 16 February 2011.

Singles
"Da Da Dam" was the first single released from the album, Paradise Oskar sang the song at the Eurovision Song Contest 2011 for Finland in the final Paradise scored 57 points and finished 21st.
"Sunday Everyday" was the second single released from the album, it was released on 6 June 2011.

Track listing

Charts

Release history

References 

2011 debut albums
Paradise Oskar albums